Chaceon atopus is a species of crab. This species resembles C. gordonae, from the Cape Verde Islands and Sierra Leone, in many features: its large size, well-developed frontal and

anterolateral teeth on the carapace, and compressed dactyli of the walking legs. It

differs from C. gordonae in having much longer walking legs, with the merus more than 6 times longer than high, and in its habitat. The species can be distinguished on sight from C. sanctaehelenae by the long, slender walking legs, the distal meral spine on the walking legs, and the well-developed anterolateral spines of the carapace.

Chaceon atopus is named after Greek atopos, meaning “atypical”, referring to the scientists' reaction after seeing its distinct appearance when compared to C. sanctaehelenae.

Description

teeth on the carapace in adults and with laterally compressed dactyli on the walking legs. The carapace is 1.4 times broader than long, very inflated and strongly convex from front to back.

It possesses a median pair of long and sharp frontal teeth, separated by a narrow, V-shaped emargination.

The carapace's surface is finely granular posterolaterally. The suborbital tooth is strong and sharply pointed, visible in dorsal view; the suborbital margin is evenly curved and tuberculate.

The cheliped merus has a sharp spine subdistally and with a distal dorsal spine; carpus roughened dorsally, with distal outer spine, denticulate anterior margin, and strong and slender distal spine. Its right chela has a distal angled projection. The meri of its walking legs have a distinct distal dorsal spine. The dactyli of its walking legs are laterally compressed, the height at midlength greater than width.

Distribution
Known only from Saint Helena Island.

References

External links

ADW entry
WORMS entry

Portunoidea
Crustaceans of the Atlantic Ocean
Crustaceans described in 1989
Taxa named by Raymond B. Manning
Taxa named by Lipke Holthuis